A guide wire may refer to:

A step in the Seldinger technique
Guide Wire, a character in the anime series Rave Master
Guidewire Software

See also 

Guy-wire, a tensioned cable providing structural support, sometimes incorrectly called "guide wire"